Ahmed Ziya (born 4 February 1981) is a Maldivian film actor, editor and director.

Career
In 2002, Ziya played the love interest of an ill-treated outsider in Abdul Faththaah's Fahu Fiyavalhu. Afterwards, he played small roles in other television series including Faththaah's Thiyey Mihithuge Vindhakee and Amjad Ibrahim's Kamana Vareh Neiy. In 2004, he appeared in Mohamed Abdulla's comedy short films series Dheke Dhekeves in two of its installments, followed by Yoosuf Shafeeu's horror children's short film series Vasvaas by playing the role of Sheikhul Hayya, a saint man. From 2007 to 2010, he mainly starred in short films in which several of them were directed by himself including Dhalhamathi, Nukandaa 2, The Boat, Keevvehey Vakivee Yaaraa? and Maafkuraashey Kalaa.

In 2011, he played a brief role in the Moomin Fuad-directed crime tragedy drama Loodhifa, which features an ensemble cast and deals with current social issues in the society told from different perspectives of the characters. Made on a budget of MVR 600,000, the film was declared a commercial failure though it received wide critical acclaim, praising the performance of cast and the film's "realism" in its language, characters and their attitude.
His next release was Ali Seezan's war action comedy film Wathan. Upon release the film received negative response from critics, where Haveeru Daily felt the film "deceived" the audience in the name of action thriller; "I highly doubt if the project team was even sure of what kind of movie they were planning to make. It is a total mess between a serious action movie and scoop comedy". The film was further criticed for remaking several shots from Jim Abrahams's parody film, Hot Shots! Part Deux (1993). He was next featured as a gang member in Yoosuf Shafeeu's action drama film Insaaf (2011) which revolves around the disputes between two districts of an island. Upon release, the film received mixed to positive reviews from critics. Ahmed Nadheem from Haveeru was impressed with the editing by Ziya and Shafeeu, though he notes the former's performance as "strictly average". Despite the reviews, he received a nomination for Best Supporting Actor and Best Editor at 2nd Maldives Film Awards.

In 2013, he starred in a small role in Hussain Munawwar's second direction, the revenge thriller film Dhilakani (2013) along with Ismail Rasheed, Niuma Mohamed, Mohamed Manik, Mohamed Faisal and Aminath Rishfa. The film which deals with a man's tumultuous journey to seek vengeance and the demolition of family bond over a girl attracted negative reception from critics while Nadheem wrote: "Embraced with futile characters, impractical scenes and outdated music, the film problematic in each department".

Personal life
Ziya married Sidhatha Shareef, former Minister of Gender, Family and Social Services, on 21 February 2021. Ziya had two previous wives and has a child to one of them.

Filmography

Feature film

Television

Short film

Other work

Accolades

References 

Living people
People from Malé
21st-century Maldivian actors
Maldivian film actors
1981 births